Holy Roller (foaled 18 November 1992) was an Australian Thoroughbred racehorse of the mid-to late 1990s. He won 12 of his 25 races and a developed a cult following amongst Sydney race fans. Bred and owned by Woodlands Stud, Holy Roller stood 18.1 hands, compared to the average thoroughbred at around 16 hands. His career highlights included wins in the Bill Ritchie Handicap and the Crystal Mile.

Holy Roller was born at Woodlands Stud Denman, New South Wales, where it took his dam over one hour give birth. The foal arrived at 02:40, yet did not stand until 03:20. Both dam and foal were exhausted and lay for almost an hour recovering. When the foal finally stood, he reached the mid-chest level of the 6ft watchman. 

His dam, Secret Blessing, was an average size mare, about 16 hands, but very wide and roomy. Most of her progeny had been fairly large - her daughters tended to be wide like her, such as Genuflect, but her daughter (aptly named 'Immense') was tall and wide, but not as big as her half-brother Holy Roller.  His sire Sanction was a fairly tall horse, 16.1h.

Holy Roller was weaned off his dam in April 1993. He was always very easy to pick out amongst the weanlings in a paddock  - he was taller than the Clydesdale foal that shared the paddock.

Woodlands Stud does not sell its yearlings, but races everything it breeds; Trevor Lobb (general manager) and their private trainer, John Hawkes, assess the youngsters in November and divides them into the appropriate groups for breaking-in. When John Hawkes saw Holy Roller the first time, he said, "He would look good pulling a cart." The yearling was shared a name with the evangelical preachers who used to roam the southern states of the United States, commonly known as "holy rollers". He was left until the very last batch of yearlings for breaking-in and didn't go to Belmont Park (north east of Sydney) until May 1994.  After the breaker rode him the first time, he said, "This huge lump knows where he is putting his feet and has tremendous balance."  Holy Roller was gelded at an early age to try to slow down his rapid growth pattern, but it didn't work.

Holy Roller didn't start until he was a late 3 year old. He then won at Canterbury and Moonee Valley (both very tight-turning tracks). He always had to race on the outside of the field to have the freedom to stretch out properly. If caught inside other horses, he would cramp up to avoid hitting the others.

At breaking-in, Holy Roller measured 17 hands and weighed an estimated 660 kg. After his fourth start, he was sent away to further mature and grow. Upon his return he measured 18.1 hands.

Jockeys who have ridden Holy Roller him say it was like riding in an old Cadillac, very smooth ride, tremendous suspension but when the stride lengthens in the straight, they get whiplash in their necks; they also refuse to dismount straight off his back but rather get down onto a handy rail if possible, then drop to the ground.  Another problem during a race was that the jockey was often unable to see horses in front of Holy Roller's neck and head (hidden underneath), and would have to trust to the horse to get around and past the smaller horse safely. Jockey Larry Cassidy said often he would ask Holy Roller to go forward in a race but the horse would refuse, then move out sideways, and Larry would realise there had been a "normal size" horse in front of him but not visible from the saddle.

Holy Roller created extra work for farriers. Standard steel shoes are about 8 inches in length but the Holy Roller needed 14 inches per hoof, meaning the farrier had to start with a straight steel bar.

Upon his retirement, his owners - "Chicken Kings" Jack and Bob Ingham - donated Holy Roller to Rod Hoare (NSW State Equine Veterinary Officer) who was looking for a big horse to compete at dressage and eventing.

References 

 Holy Roller's pedigree and partial racing stats

1992 racehorse births
Thoroughbred family 16-a
Racehorses bred in Australia
Racehorses trained in Australia